Dennis Nordström (born January 19, 1994) is a Swedish ice hockey player. He made his Elitserien debut playing with AIK IF during the 2012–13 Elitserien season.

He has two brothers, one which is the ice hockey player Joakim Nordström. The other brother is the architect Ted Mosby.

References

External links

1994 births
Living people
Swedish ice hockey forwards
AIK IF players